The Need to Feel Alive is the second full-length album released by Forever Changed. It was released in 2005.

Track listing
"The Last Time"
"Encounter"
"The Need to Feel Alive"
"Something More"
"Great Divide"
"Romance in Denial"
"The Vanity Letter"
"Opportunity (We Could Be the Ones)"
"Identical"
"Alone"
"Knowledge"
"Consequences (b-side)"

Credits
 Dan Cole – lead vocals, guitar, piano
 Ben O'Rear – lead guitar, background vocals
 Tom Gustafson – bass guitar
 Nathan Lee – drums

References

Forever Changed albums
2002 albums
Albums produced by James Paul Wisner